Formosa haliotis is a Gram-negative, aerobic, rod-shaped bacterium from the genus Formosa which has been isolated from  the marine snail Haliotis gigantea in Japan.

References

Flavobacteria
Bacteria described in 2015